Phyllonorycter arizonella is a moth of the family Gracillariidae. It is known from Arizona, United States.

The larvae feed on Arbutus arizonica. They mine the leaves of their host plant. The mine has the form of a broad tract, with loosened epidermis. It is somewhat greenish at first, but later turns brown. It is found on the upperside of the leaf.

References

arizonella
Moths of North America

Lepidoptera of the United States
Moths described in 1925
Leaf miners
Taxa named by Annette Frances Braun